Waeseong in Jukseong-ri, Gijang is located in Gijang-gun, Busan, South Korea. It is a stone fortress built by the Japanese general, Kuroda Nagamasa who was defending the area against the Korean Joseon army in about June 1593, during the second year of the Imjin War. 

This wall-fortress built on the stronghold in the rear coast of the village of Jukseong-ri, was 11,176 pyeongs (pyeong was a unit of area in the Joseon period) in area, about 300 metres in circumference, 4 metres in height, and three-storied. It has been called the Gijang fortress in Japan. It was placed at the strategically important point linking together the Seosaengpo Waeseong fortress in Ulsan, the Hakseong fortress and the Busanjinseong Fortress. Originally, it was built with the stones which had once constituted the Dumopojinseong fortress, so there still remain the footstones of it in a row around the villages in Dumopo. 

Today, the surrounding areas of the fortress are used as farming fields, but the stone wall still remains maintaining its original state relatively well.

Japanese-style castles in Korea
Castles in South Korea